The Supreme Court of the Northern Territory in Australia has six resident Judges, including a Chief Justice.  Judges from other Courts and retired Judges have regularly held appointment as additional or acting Judges to assist, particularly with appeal sittings where at least three Judges are required.

The Northern Territory went through a period where from 1961 up until Self-Government in 1978 Federal Court (and before that Commonwealth) judges were appointed and sat occasionally in the Northern Territory.

Notes

References

 
Northern Territory Supreme Court
Supreme Court of Northern Territory
Supreme Court Judges